Kaiku was a Spanish UCI Professional Continental cycling team based in the Basque country that participated in UCI Continental Circuits races and when selected as a wildcard to UCI ProTour events.

The team was managed by Eneko Garate with assistance from directeur sportifs Óscar Guerrero, Juan Hernández and Juan Campos.

The lead sponsor, Kaiku Corporación Alimentaria, is a Basque country dairy products company in which Caja Rural de Navarra at one time held a financial stake.

In its first season, 2005, Kaiku, a.k.a. "Kaiku–Caja Rural", was formed from Caja Rural's amateur team. Kaiku Corporación had in the previous 22 years sponsored amateur teams that had featured riders who later became famous, such as Juan Antonio Flecha, Joseba Beloki, Juan Carlos Domínguez, Miguel Ángel Martín Perdiguero, Mikel Zarrabeitia, and Abraham Olano, but the company had not sponsored any team in the previous 5 years.

2006 squad

External links
 Former Sponsor's Site

References

Defunct cycling teams based in Spain
Cycling teams established in 2005
Cycling teams disestablished in 2006
2005 establishments in Spain
2006 disestablishments in Spain